The University of Zakho (UoZ) is located in Zakho, the Duhok Governorate, Iraqi Kurdistan, northern Iraq.

History
Its founding was announced as an independent university in July 2010. Before this date, there were the Colleges of Education and of Commerce, which were affiliated with the University of Duhok. University of Zakho along with another three new universities were founded following the resolution made by the Parliament of Kurdistan Regional to address the increased demand for higher education studies in the region.

Once the university was nominated, the colleges of Education and Commerce were reorganized into two faculties: Science and Humanities.

Faculties and Colleges

Faculty of Science 
Once the new campus in Zakho was completed, the Colleges of Education and Commerce, which were affiliated by the University of Duhok, were transferred at the beginning of the academic year 2005/2006. After announcing the University of Zakho as an independent university according to the Prime Minister Resolution No. 1670, on July, 8th 2010 and the Ministry of Higher Education resolution No. 644 on July 12, 2010, the Colleges of Education and Commerce were reorganized into the Faculties of Science and Humanities.

The Faculty of Science includes six departments:
Biology
Chemistry
Physics
Computer Science
Mathematics
Environmental Science (The last high school graduates in this department received in 2020)

The duration of the study in the faculty is four academic years and the graduate will obtain B. Sc. degree in Science. Students accepted in the college of Education will be awarded B. Sc. Degree in Education. The College enrolls at the moment, 982 undergraduate students. The Faculty is offering postgraduate programs (M. Sc. and Ph.D.).

The faculty has highly efficient and experienced teaching staff members providing the students with high-quality programs and using modern teaching and practice facilities to fulfill the market requirements. Also, the faculty carry our several Conferences, workshops and training courses for teaching staff members, technical staffs as well as school teachers from various parts of Kurdistan as a part of capacity building program.

College of Engineering
The College of Engineering was established in summer 2013. The University of Zakho announced the Petroleum Engineering as the first department of the Faculty of Engineering in 2013, due to the increasing demand for petroleum engineers and production of oil in the region. Indeed, more departments will be launched in the future.
The duration of the study in the faculty is four academic years and graduate students will obtain a bachelor's degree in Science (BSc).
The faculty has a highly efficient and experienced teaching staff, providing students with high-quality programs and they are using modern teaching and practical facilities to fulfill the industrial requirements. In addition, the faculty has established strong links with the industry and academic collaboration with various universities such as the University of Leeds, the University of Derby, the University of Nottingham, and the University of Colorado, as well as local universities in the region.

The College of Engineering includes two departments:
Petroleum Engineering
Mechanical Engineering

Faculty of Humanities
The Faculty of Humanities includes six departments:
Kurdish language
English language
Arabic language
Turkish language
History
Islamic Studies

At the beginning of the next academic year,  a new “Department of the Origin of Religions “ will be operating as well.

Faculty of Education
The Faculty of Humanities includes three schools, namely:
School of Physical Education
School of Basic Education
School of General Psychology

College of Administration and Economics
The College includes three departments, namely:
Department of Economic Sciences
Department of Banking and Financial Sciences
Department of Management Sciences

References

External links 
 Official University of Zakho website

Zakho
Zakho
Public universities
Educational institutions established in 2010
2010 establishments in Iraqi Kurdistan